Arunachalam Vellayan (born 9 January 1953, Chennai) is a member of the Murugappa family and the vice-chairman of the Murugappa Group, based in Chennai, India. In February 2018, he stepped down as chairman of the group, ceding the spot to his cousin M.M.Murugappan. He is the Chairman of Coromandel International Limited and EID Parry (India) Ltd. He is also the Chairman of the Fertiliser Association of India, and is a Director in AMM Educational Foundation and Kanoria Chemicals and Industries Ltd, Calcutta.

Education
Vellayan was educated at The Doon School and went to Shri Ram College of Commerce, University of Delhi, and then Warwick Business School in the UK.

Career
He holds a diploma in Industrial Administration from Aston University, UK and a master's degree in Business Studies from the University of Warwick Business School, UK, and has been conferred the Doctor of  Science (Honoris Causa) by the Tamil Nadu Agricultural University, Coimbatore. Some of the other positions held by him in the past include:

 Vice President — Federation of Indian Export Organisation
 Member — Board of Governors, Doon School
 President — ICC, India
 President — All India Cycle Manufacturers’ Association
 Director — EXIM Bank
 Director — Indian Overseas Bank

In May 2015, Indian market regulator SEBI charged him in an Insider trading case related to the acquisition of Sabero Organics by Coromandel International in 2011.

On 31-Jan-2018 he has been appointed the new chairman of the Society and Board of Governors of Indian Institute of Management, Kozhikode (IIM-K).

References

External links
 Murugappa Group

1953 births
Living people
Tamil businesspeople
Tamil billionaires
The Doon School alumni
Alumni of the University of Warwick
Delhi University alumni
Shri Ram College of Commerce alumni
Murugappa family